Mr. U.S. is a Big Bang Comics superhero who appeared in the Image Comics line, as its version of Captain America.

The different versions of Mr. U.S. refer to the different comic-book ages and how each age tools its characters for a certain audience, leading from the cheesy, hyperactive Silver Age of comics, to the dark, gritty comics of the 1990s.

In all of the versions however, Mr. U.S. shares the ability of enhanced strength thanks to artificial limbs implanted for certain reasons:
Golden Age - The fight against Nazism
Silver Age - The fight against Communism (This has many McCarthyism undertones)
Bronze and Modern Ages - The fight against Terrorism

References

Official website
Official Website

Comics characters with superhuman strength
Image Comics superheroes
Big Bang Comics
United States-themed superheroes